Dennis Alexander Reid (2 March 19471998) was a Scottish footballer whose career as a midfielder extended from 1964 (Rangers) to 1977 (Ayr United).

A native of Glasgow, Alex Reid began his professional career with hometown club Rangers, but left after making only three league appearances at senior level. Joining Dundee United in 1968, Reid's performances against Newcastle United in the 1969 Fair Cup won him a somewhat-delayed move to Tyneside in 1971, although he returned to Scotland eighteen months later with Morton. Three seasons later, Reid returned to Dundee United before finishing his career with a couple of appearances for Ayr United.

After retiring in 1977 due to injury, Reid moved to Canada where he died in the year of his 51st birthday.

References

External links

Scottish footballers
Rangers F.C. players
Dundee United F.C. players
Newcastle United F.C. players
Greenock Morton F.C. players
Ayr United F.C. players
Footballers from Glasgow
Scottish emigrants to Canada
Scottish Football League players
Association football midfielders
English Football League players
1947 births
1998 deaths
Date of death missing
Place of death missing